The following is a list of fictional vehicles.

List of lists
 List of fictional aircraft
 List of fictional cars
 List of fictional ships
 List of fictional spacecraft

Buses

Buses often appear as settings, or sometimes even characters, in works of fiction. This is a list of named buses which were important story elements in notable works of fiction, including books, films and television series.
 The Battle Bus, from Fortnite
 Bus 25/25, from the 1994 film Speed
 Catbus, a sentient bus from the 1988 film My Neighbor Totoro 
 "Cyclops", a nucelar-powered bus from the 1976 film The Big Bus
 "Bertie the Bus" and "Bulgy the Double-Decker Bus", from The Railway Series and Thomas & Friends.
 "Doris", the fictional band's tour bus in the 2000 film Almost Famous.
 The Knight Bus, which appears in several of the Harry Potter books and films
 The Magic School Bus
 "Priscilla", the eponymous bus in the 1994 film The Adventures of Priscilla, Queen of the Desert
 "Sweetheart", in John Steinbeck's The Wayward Bus 
 "Tayo", "Rogi", "Lani", and "Gani", bus characters from the Korean animated children's show, Tayo the Little Bus.

Hovercraft/anti-gravity vehicles 
 Hoverboard
 Snowspeeder
 Speeder bike

Magical vehicles
 Broomstick
 Catbus
 The Chariot of Morgan Mwynfawr
 Killdozer
 Magic carpet
 Seven-league boots
 Ruby slippers
 Cinderella's pumpkin coach
 Santa's sleigh
 The Yellow Submarine

Mecha 

 Big Darrell - OK K.O.! Let's Be Heroes
 Big O - The Big O
 E-frame - Exosquad
 Evangelions - Neon Genesis Evangelion
 Mobile weapons - Gundam
 Tripod - three-legged Martian fighting machine, armed with a heat-ray, The War of the Worlds
VF-1 Valkyrie - variable geometry space fighter from Robotech (TV series)
 Voltron
 Z-Mech - Plants vs. Zombies: Garden Warfare 2

Railroads and trains 

 Blaine the train - the Dark Tower by Steven King
 Hooterville Cannonball - Petticoat Junction
 The Quadrail trains - the Timothy Zahn series
 Undersea Super Train: Marine Express
 The Wanderer -  The Wild Wild West
 Wabash Cannonball
 Baby Train
 Snowpiercer
 Supertrain
 Galaxy Express 999
 Tachypomp
 Blaine the Mono
 The Polar Express
 The Hogwarts Express - Harry Potter
 The Atlantic Express - Avalanche Express
 Central Pacific Railroad No. 131 - Back to the Future Part III
 The Transcontinental Express - The Cassandra Crossing
 The Indian Valley Railroad - Shining Time Station and Thomas and the Magic Railroad
 Wilson, Brewster and Koko - Chuggington
 Azul - Dora the Explorer
 Casey Junior - Dumbo (1941) and Dumbo (2019)
 Puffa and Little Owl - TUGS
 Driver Dan's Story Train
 The Greendale Rocket and The Pencaster Flyer - Postman Pat
 Ivor the Engine
 The Ninky Nonk - In the Night Garden

The Railway Series 
There are many railway and other 'vehicle' characters in The Railway Series children's books by Rev. W. Awdry. For a list, please see:
 List of characters in The Railway Series

Thomas the Tank Engine and Friends 
Thomas the Tank Engine and Friends is the TV spin-off from The Railway Series. As such, it shares many characters with the original books but also introduces a vast array of new characters. These, too, are collated in a set of lists:
 List of Thomas & Friends characters
 List of Thomas & Friends film characters

AFVs

Tanks 
 Bolo - AI armored super-heavy tank
 Griffon tank - Warhammer 40,000
 RX-75 Guntank - Mobile Suit Gundam
 Leman Russ MBT - Warhammer 40,000

Other 
 Howl's Moving Castle
 TARDIS
 B-Ped - Teen Titans
 Farcaster - Hyperion Cantos
 Time Tunnel - The Time Tunnel
 Transporter - Star Trek
 Time machine - novella "The Time Machine" by H. G. Wells
 Laputa - Gulliver's Travels and Castle in the Sky
 Steam Castle - Steamboy
 Manhattan Island - Cities in Flight
 Death City -  Soul Eater (anime but not manga)
 2019 Spinner - self-contained lift, Blade Runner 1982 design by Syd Mead
 Supercar - Supercar

See also 
The following are lists of mixed types of vehicles, not otherwise categorized above:

Literature
 Known Space#Technology
 List of stories featuring nuclear pulse propulsion
 Intelligent car

Film
 List of James Bond vehicles
 List of Star Wars air, aquatic, and ground vehicles
 List of Star Wars spacecraft
 List of Star Wars starfighters

Television
 Buck Rogers in the 25th Century
 Fireman Sam - vehicles
 Gerry Anderson's New Captain Scarlet - vehicles and aircraft
 Terrahawks - vehicles
 Thunderbirds machines
 Transformers
 Zaido: Pulis Pangkalawakan - vehicles

Games
 Warhammer 40,000

Comics, graphic novels and animation
 List of vehicles in Marvel Comics

References

Fictional vehicles
Fictional
Vehicles